The Seattle Thunderbolts are an American professional Twenty20 franchise cricket team that compete in Minor League Cricket (MiLC). The team is based in Seattle, Washington. It was formed in 2021 as part of 3 new teams to compete in Minor League Cricket. The franchise is owned by Seattle Sports LLC, as part of its cricket development program, owned by Phani Chitneni, Vijay Beniwal, and Salman Taj.

The team's home ground is Klahanie Park and Marymoor Park, both located in the Eastside region of King County, Washington. Harmeet Singh was named as captain, while Andries Gous was named as vice-captain for the team.

The current leading run-scorer is Andries Gous, with the highest wicket-taker being Shadley van Schalkwyk.

Franchise history

Background 
Talks of an American Twenty20 league started in November 2018 just before USA Cricket became the new governing body of cricket in the United States. In May 2021, USA Cricket announced they had accepted a bid by American Cricket Enterprises (ACE) for a US$1 billion investment covering the league and other investments benefitting the U.S. national teams.

In an Annual General Meeting on February 21, 2020, it was announced that USA Cricket was planning to launch Major League Cricket in 2021 and Minor League Cricket that summer, but it was delayed due to the COVID-19 pandemic and due to the lack of high-quality cricket stadiums in the USA. Major League Cricket was pushed to a summer-2023 launch and Minor League Cricket was pushed back to July 31, 2021.

USA Cricket CEO Iain Higgins pointed out cities such as New York City, Houston and Los Angeles with a large cricket fanbase, and targeted them among others as launch cities for Minor League Cricket.

2021 season 

Before the season's drafting, USA Cricket and American Cricket Enterprises (ACE) announced 3 new teams for the 2021 season including the Seattle Thunderbolts, the Manhattan Yorkers, and the St. Louis Americans. Ahead of the official season, which was announced to kick off on July 31, they announced Harmeet Singh as captain and Andries Gous as vice-captain.

For their first four matches of the season, they lost by a margin of 7, 6, 2, and 7 wickets, before going on a 6-match winning streak. Their winning streak was ended due to a 46-run loss against the Michigan Cricket Stars. They then lost back-to-back matches against the Golden State Grizzlies and the East Bay Blazers, before winning by 7 wickets against the Silicon Valley Strikers in their last match of the season.

They ended off the group stage with 7 wins and 7 losses, ending up in 4th place in their division, thus not qualifying for the finals.

2022 season 
Ahead of the 2022 season, Major League Cricket announced that the draft for that season would take place on May 12.

Current squad 
 Players with international caps are listed in bold.
  denotes a player who is currently unavailable for selection.
  denotes a player who is unavailable for rest of the season

Statistics

Most runs 

Source: CricClubs, Last updated: 23 September 2021

Most wickets 

Source: CricClubs, Last updated: 23 September 2021

See also 
 Minor League Cricket
 Major League Cricket

References 

Minor League Cricket teams
Cricket clubs established in 2021
2021 establishments in Washington (state)